Hartge was a third party car tuning company specializing in BMW, MINI, Juno, and Range Rover cars. Founded in 1971 in Merzig, Germany, the company moved to its current location in Beckingen in 1974. The company is known for putting larger, more powerful factory BMW engines in smaller cars, such as engines from the 5 Series into the smaller 3 Series. In 1985 Hartge was granted manufacturer's status in Germany. All vehicles built from then on received a Hartge Motorsport VIN plate in place on the BMW VIN plate. The company was liquidated in mid-2019 and deleted from the commercial register.

References

BMW
Auto parts suppliers of Germany
German companies established in 1971
Automotive motorsports and performance companies
Auto tuning companies